Andrew James Peters (April 3, 1872 – June 26, 1938) was an American politician who served in the United States House of Representatives and as the 42nd Mayor of Boston, today best remembered for his role in the death of Starr Faithfull.

Early years
Peters was born on April 3, 1872, in West Roxbury, Massachusetts. His family had been in Massachusetts since the first Andrew Peters arrived there in 1657. He attended Harvard University earning an A.B. in 1895 and a LL.B. from Harvard Law School in 1898.

Political career
Peters served two terms in the Massachusetts State Senate (1904, 1905). In 1906, he was elected to the U.S. House of Representatives, where he served from 1907 to 1914.

In 1914, Peters was appointed to be Assistant Secretary of the Treasury under William Gibbs McAdoo in the first administration of President Woodrow Wilson. He served there until 1918, when he began his term as Mayor of Boston, having defeated incumbent James Michael Curley in the 1917 mayoral election. He handled the Boston police strike in 1919.

Peters was considered for Governor of Massachusetts later in the 1920s, but was not nominated. He served as treasurer of a Massachusetts state campaign against money-hoarding organized at the request of President Herbert Hoover in 1932, and was named to the Massachusetts Advisory Committee of the Home Owners' Loan Corporation in 1933.

Personal life
Peters married Martha Phillips in 1910 and they had six children.

Peters' cousin-in-law, Helen Faithfull, had a young daughter named Starr Wyman, later Starr Faithfull, who attracted his attention in 1917. A student of the Rogers Hall School in Lowell, Massachusetts, she spent summers with the Peters. He began to sexually abuse her when she was eleven, dosing her with ether, reading to her from Havelock Ellis's books about sex, and taking her to hotels. She drowned under mysterious circumstances off Long Island in 1931. When her diaries were found, the story came out, and her stepfather produced evidence that Peters paid him and Helen to keep quiet. Through a family friend and attorney, Peters denied "improper relations" with her. He is reported to have had a nervous breakdown as a result of the scandal. This story became part of the material used by John O'Hara in his novel BUtterfield 8. Peters is a key character in Dennis Lehane's novel The Given Day.

Peters died of pneumonia in Boston on June 26, 1938.

See also
 Timeline of Boston, 1900s–1920s
 125th Massachusetts General Court (1904)
 126th Massachusetts General Court (1905)

References 

Goodman, Jonathan.: The Passing of Starr Faithfull. (London: Piatkus, c. 1990) 
Russell, Francis.: A City in Terror, 1919: The Boston Police Strike (New York: Viking Press, c. 1975) 
Russell, Francis.: The Knave of Boston & Other Ambiguous Massachusetts Characters (Boston: Quinlan Press, c. 1988) (pp. 68–84: "The Mayor and the Nymphet") 
City of Boston Statistics Department The Municipal Register for 1918 (1918) p. 2.

Further reading

External links

 Peters election results at ourcampaigns.com
 

Mayors of Boston
Democratic Party members of the Massachusetts House of Representatives
Democratic Party Massachusetts state senators
Harvard Law School alumni
1872 births
1938 deaths
Democratic Party members of the United States House of Representatives from Massachusetts
People from Jamaica Plain